Evgeny Kurbatov (born May 18, 1988) is a Russian professional ice hockey defenceman who currently plays for HC Lada Togliatti of the Supreme Hockey League (VHL).

References

External links

1988 births
Living people
Amur Khabarovsk players
Avangard Omsk players
Avtomobilist Yekaterinburg players
HC CSKA Moscow players
HK Dukla Michalovce players
HC Khimik Voskresensk players
HC Lada Togliatti players
Omskie Yastreby players
HC Neftekhimik Nizhnekamsk players
HC Sarov players
Torpedo Nizhny Novgorod players
Russian ice hockey defencemen
Russian expatriate ice hockey people
Russian expatriate sportspeople in Belarus
Russian expatriate sportspeople in Slovakia
Russian expatriate sportspeople in Ukraine
Expatriate ice hockey players in Slovakia
Expatriate ice hockey players in Belarus
Expatriate ice hockey players in Ukraine